The 2017 Judo Grand Prix Tashkent was held at the Uzbekistan Tennis Courts in Tashkent, Uzbekistan, from 6 to 8 October 2017.

Medal summary

Men's events

Women's events

Source Results

Medal table

References

External links
 

2017 IJF World Tour
2017 Judo Grand Prix
Judo
Judo